CMA CGM Amerigo Vespucci is an Explorer class containership built for CMA CGM. It is named after Italian explorer Amerigo Vespucci. It has a capacity of 13,830 TEU.

References

Container ships
Amerigo Vespucci
Amerigo Vespucci
Ships built by Daewoo Shipbuilding & Marine Engineering
2009 ships